The Humana Building, also known as the Humana Tower, is a 1985 skyscraper in downtown Louisville, Kentucky, located at 500 West Main Street and headquarters of the Humana Corporation. It was built by The Auchter Company.

Description
The 26-story structure is headquarters of the Humana Corporation, and was designed by the Driehaus Prize winner and New Classical architect Michael Graves. Construction began in October 1982 and was completed in May 1985.

Each side of the building is designed slightly differently, up to a sloping pyramid style for the upper few floors. The building is also known for its exterior construction of flat pink granite. The north facade's loggia is respectful of the older downtown architecture, being flush with the original Main Street storefronts. The open-air front portion of the loggia contains a large fountain. The large, curved portion towards the top of the building is an open-air observation deck. The outermost point of the circle has space for a few people at a time to be surrounded by glass, allowing for views of the Ohio River and Main Street. The observation deck has not been open to the public since the September 11 terrorist attacks.

Awards
The American Institute of Architects awarded the Humana Building the National Honor Award in 1987. Time Magazine listed it as one of the ten best buildings of the 1980s.

References

External links 
 The Humana Building in Louisville
 Analysis and detail pictures

Office buildings completed in 1985
Michael Graves buildings
Architecture in Kentucky
Skyscraper office buildings in Louisville, Kentucky
Postmodern architecture in the United States
New Classical architecture